Solaris is a 2012 opera by Detlev Glanert to a libretto by Reinhard Palm, based on the the novel by Stanislaw Lem. It was commissioned by and premiered at the Bregenz Festival and revived at Oper Köln in 2014.

References

Operas